Tony Lloyd (born 3 December 1956) is a former British professional tennis player.

Biography
Lloyd is the youngest of three brothers who played tennis at the top level. Two brothers, David Lloyd and John Lloyd, represented Great Britain in the Davis Cup. All three appeared in the main singles draw of the 1977 Wimbledon Championships, which was Tony's only Grand Slam appearance in singles. Given a wild card into the main draw, Lloyd was beaten in the first round by John Alexander.

More noted as a doubles player, he often partnered with his brother John. The pair were runners-up at the 1979 Paris Open, an indoor Grand Prix tournament, and twice made the third round of the Wimbledon Championships, in 1979 and 1980. During their run in 1979 they defeated number two seeds Wojtek Fibak and Tom Okker.

Grand Prix career finals

Doubles: 1 (0–1)

References

External links
 
 

1956 births
Living people
People from Leigh-on-Sea
Tennis people from Essex
English male tennis players
British male tennis players